The 1983 Langs Supreme Scottish Masters was a professional non-ranking snooker tournament that took place between 22 and 25 September 1983 at the Skean Dhu Hotel in Glasgow, Scotland.

Steve Davis beat Murdo MacLeod 5–1 in the quarter-finals, including breaks of 102 and 137. Alex Higgins beat Jimmy White 5–3, after White had won the first two frames, and Tony Knowles beat Tony Meo 5–4 after winning the last three frames.

Steve Davis won the tournament by defeating Tony Knowles 9–6 in the final, finishing the match with a break of 114 and winning the first prize of £10,000.

Tournament draw

References

1983
Masters
Scottish Masters
Scottish Masters